Per meg equals 0.001 permil or 0.0001 percent or parts per million ppm. The unit is typically used in isotope analysis  by multiplying an isotope ratio in delta annotation, for example δ18O, by 1000000. 
This annotation is typically used in studies of atmospheric trace gases, where a high precision is needed for a significant interpretation of results.

References

Fractions (mathematics)
Environmental isotopes
Geochemistry